Igor Emilievich Vernik (born October 11, 1963) is a Soviet and Russian film and theater actor, producer, television and radio host.

Biography 
Igor was born in 1963 in  family of Emil   Vernik (1924 — 2021), director of the All-Union Radio, People's Artist of Russia and his wife Anna  Vernik (1927 — 2009) is a lawyer by education, music school teacher. Twin brother   Vadim, journalist and broadcaster.

In 1984 he graduated from the Moscow Art Theater School-Studio (course of Ivan Tarkhanov).

Since 1986   —  actor of Moscow Art Theatre School.

From 2000 to 2001, he led the program  The Seventh Sense  on Channel One Russia.

February 9, 2012, was officially registered as an authorized representative of presidential candidate Mikhail Prokhorov.

Igor Vernik performed in the ballet Nureyev during its premiere as the auctioneer (a vocal role).

Selected filmography
 Jaguar (1986) as Cava
 Frenzied Bus (1990) as Israeli MIA officer
 The Master and Margarita (1994) as Judas Iscariot
 Heads and Tails (1996) as Felix Barmakov
 8 ½ $ (1999) as  Boba, Stepan's bodyguard
 Savages (2006) as Murzya
 Heat (2006) as employee of the film studio
 12 (2007) as silver eyewitness witness
 Daddy's Daughters (2008) as cameo
 Love in the Big City 2 (2010) as director of dental clinic
 The White Guard (2012) as Shchur
 Moms (2012) as producer
 Kitchen (2014) as German Mikhailovich Land
 Terrible Dad (2022) as Pototsky
 Clipmakers (2023) as himself

Awards and honours
 Honored Artist of the Russian Federation (1999)
 Meritorious Artist of the Chechen Republic (2013)
 People's Artist of the Russian Federation (2016)

References

External links 
 

1963 births
Living people
Male actors from Moscow
Singers from Moscow
Soviet male film actors
Soviet male stage actors
Russian male film actors
Russian male stage actors
Russian male television actors
Russian television presenters
Russian radio personalities
Soviet male singers
People's Artists of Russia
Honored Artists of the Russian Federation
Soviet Jews
Russian twins
Converts to Buddhism from Judaism
Russian Buddhists
Jewish Russian actors
Moscow Art Theatre School alumni